Icarius De Menezes (born 20 April 1975, Curitiba, Brazil) is a Brazilian creative director. He lives and works in Milan.

Development

As a student, Icarius caught the attention of the Brazilian press with the presentation of his conceptual and polemical collections, with subjects including cancer and plastic surgery, and reflections on the social and political decadence so rife in Brazil at the time, giving them a broader, more sophisticated and cleaner allure. During this time he also worked as a collaborator for Vogue Brazil and Casa Vogue. Following his graduation from the Santa Marcelina Fine Arts School in the late 1990s, he launched his prêt-à-porter label ICARIUS. During this same period, he also worked as head designer for Ellus, the foremost denim label, and thus had the opportunity to develop his versatility as both labels had a strong impact.

At the age of 24, Icarius presented his prêt-à-porter collections at Carrousel du Louvre in Paris from 2000 to 2002. The collections were characterized by his artist's obsession with the human body in all its forms, mixed with experimental prints and a delicate style of minimal and new age. The Icarius label enjoyed worldwide success and praise from the international press and buyers, and was immediately snapped up by such stores as Barneys, Neiman Marcus, Maria Luisa, Joseph, Selfridges, Joyce and Daslu.

Icarius took part in Enka Mania, a project to promote new designers, sponsored by Vogue Italia. It was on this occasion that Franca Sozzani, the prestigious head of the jury, gave him the task of renewing Lancetti, the historic Italian maison, with the responsibility of restoring it to a respectable position in Italian fashion. As creative director, he successfully relaunched Lancetti, giving it a fresh, clean and sophisticated line, and once again igniting the attention of buyers and the press, and broadening its client list with boutiques such as Antonia and Saks Dubai.

Icarius was given the role of creative director for all Diesel lines: denim, female and male collections, accessories, underwear and beachwear. He was also made brand creator, style coordinator and head designer for "Diesel Black Gold" in New York's official calendar, giving him the opportunity to compare aligned strategies for different markets.

After all that Icarius decided to retire for a period to concentrate himself to a new project which consists of a mix of all his experiences and all his future visions: an online platform which gives creative minds the possibility to express themselves by interpreting the DNA of ICARIUS; it is a search for male beauty and perfection connecting fashion, science, art and technology.

References

External links
 
 icarius.com 
 vogue.it 
 chic.ig.com.br 
 hypercool.com.br 
 dianepernet 
 upost.com.br 
 thesouthernmostgentleman The Southernmost Gentleman
 fuckingyoung.es Fucking Young
 thefashionisto.com 
 itdandy.com.br 
 phenomenon.hu 
 mybitofbeautiful My Bit of beautiful
 kavanaghlove Kavanagh Love
 zimbio.com Zimbio
 Icarius De Menezes Information NY Times
 

1975 births
Living people
Brazilian designers